The Buhui is a left tributary of the river Caraș (Karaš) in Romania. It discharges into the Caraș upstream from Carașova. The river first flows through Lake Buhui. Thereafter it flows through the Buhui Cave and, after emerging from the cave, flows through a reach of narrow gorges in the Semenic-Cheile Carașului National Park before joining the Caraș.

References

Rivers of Romania
Rivers of Caraș-Severin County